Gjylekar or Skifteraj is a village in Viti municipality, Kosovo.

Geography 
The village borders the Anamorava valley in the North and is situated in the Karadak mountains.

History 
The ancestors of the inhabitants of the village belong to the Gashi tribe and originally settled in the Gjakova Highlands.

The Austro-Hungarian consulate in Belgrade reported that during February 1913, Serbian military forces massacred nearly all Albanian inhabitants of the village.

Notes

References 

Villages in Viti, Kosovo